"Open Up Your Heart" is a 1966 single by Buck Owens.  "Open Up Your Heart" was a number one country hit for Buck Owens, spending four weeks at the top spot and total of twenty weeks on the country charts.

Chart performance

References
 

Buck Owens songs
1966 singles
Nancy Wilson (jazz singer) songs
Songs written by Buck Owens
Song recordings produced by Ken Nelson (American record producer)
Capitol Records singles
1966 songs